Vincent Philippe Eugene "Blackie" Chouinard (January 5, 1902 – January 29, 1957) was a Canadian professional ice hockey player who played eight games in the National Hockey League with the Ottawa Senators during the 1927–28 season. The rest of his career, which lasted from 1921 to 1938, was spent in various minor leagues.

Playing career
Chouinard played in the Ottawa City Hockey League (OCHL) from 1921–25 in his hometown with the Ottawa Montagnards. He then played the 1925–26 season in the Central Hockey League with the Eveleth-Hibbing Rangers and following season in Niagara Falls, Ontario. During the 1927–28 Chouinard played for the Quebec Castors, the Waterville, Maine, and he also joined the Ottawa Senators for eight games during the 1927–28. Chouinard played failed to score a point in eight NHL games, but he did go on to play eight more years of professional hockey with New Haven Eagles (1928–31 and 1933–34), Bronx Tigers (1931–32), Riviere-du-Loup Lancers and Quebec Castors (1932–33), Tulsa Oilers and London Tecumsehs (1934–36), and Perth Crescents (1937–38).

Coaching career
He first retired as a player in 1936 to become the coach of the Perth Blue Wings in the OVHL for one year. He played a final games with the Perth Crescents during the 1937–38 season before retiring for good.

Career statistics

Regular season and playoffs

References

External links
 

1902 births
1957 deaths
Bronx Tigers players
Canadian ice hockey defencemen
Eveleth Rangers players
Franco-Ontarian people
Ice hockey people from Ottawa
London Tecumsehs players
New Haven Eagles players
Niagara Falls Cataracts players
Ottawa Senators (1917) players
Quebec Castors players
Tulsa Oilers (AHA) players